Centrosomal protein of 120 kDa (Cep120), also known as coiled-coil domain-containing protein 100, is a protein that in humans is encoded by the CEP120 gene.

Function 

This gene encodes a protein that functions in the microtubule-dependent coupling of the nucleus and the centrosome. A similar protein in mouse plays a role in both interkinetic nuclear migration, which is a characteristic pattern of nuclear movement in neural progenitors, and in neural progenitor self-renewal. Mutations in this gene are predicted to result in neurogenic defects.

References

External links
 
 PDBe-KB provides an overview of all the structure information available in the PDB for Human Centrosomal protein of 120 kDa  (CEP120)

Further reading 

Centrosome